Apollo in the Forge of Vulcan, sometimes referred to as Vulcan's Forge, is an oil painting by Diego de Velázquez completed after his first visit to Italy in 1629. Critics agree that the work should be dated to 1630, the same year as his companion painting Joseph's Tunic. It appears that neither of the two paintings were commissioned by the king, although both became part of the royal collections within a short time. The painting became part of the collection of the Museo del Prado, in Madrid, in 1819.

Apollo in the Forge of Vulcan has been cited as one of the most important works from Velázquez's first trip to Italy and "one of his most successful compositions with regard to the unified, natural interaction of the figures."

Subject
The painting depicts the moment when the god Apollo, identifiable by the crown of laurel on his head, visits Vulcan, who is found making weapons for war. The god Apollo tells Vulcan that his wife, Venus, is having an affair with Mars, the god of war. For this reason, the other figures in the room are looking in surprise at the god who has just appeared before them, some of them even opening their mouths to indicate surprise.

Velázquez was inspired to create this work by an engraving by Antonio Tempesta, modifying it greatly and centering the narrative action on the arrival of Apollo, using a classical baroque style. It emphasises contemporary interest in nude figures, influenced by Greco-Roman statuary and the classical movement of Guido Reni. The frieze-style method of composition could also come from Reni. On the other hand, the clear shades of the figure of Apollo are reminiscent of Guercino.

This work was created in Rome without commission at the request of the painter Peter Paul Rubens who had also visited Spain in 1629. Velázquez painted two large canvases in the house of the Spanish ambassador. These two canvases formed a pair and were brought back to Spain with his luggage: Joseph's Tunic and Apollo in the Forge of Vulcan.

Analysis
The subject is taken from Roman mythology, specifically from Ovid's Metamorphoses. Velázquez interpreted the scene into a strictly human version, with contemporary figures. Apollo is seen wearing a toga which leaves his torso exposed to view. Vulcan, in this picture, is just a blacksmith, as are his helpers, who are men from the village who know the trade. Vulcan is staring at him in astonishment after having heard the news of his wife's adultery with the god Mars, for whom he is forging armour at this very moment. The cave in which the blacksmith god forges weapons for the other deities in this painting is shown as a smithy, similar to those Velázquez could have seen in Spain or in Rome. With characteristic mastery Velázquez also painted a variety of objects which would be commonly found in a forge.

Velázquez interest in nudes is not surprising, and evidence of this appears as early as his arrival in Madrid in 1623, although the appearance of them in his works increased after his first visit to Italy in the years 1629–1631.

During his Italian journey he was also influenced by Venetian painting, which can be seen in his use of colour, for example in Apollo's striking orange toga. From his travels through Rome he was influenced by Michelangelo to create extremely large and strong figures. The musculature of Vulcan and the other figures that surround him is not insignificant; they are athletic figures who show off their strength without modesty, even standing in positions that show off their muscles to greater effect.

On the other hand, Velázquez was always obsessed with achieving depth in his works. In this case he started to use what is known as "space sandwiching", that is, putting some figures in front of others so that the sensation of depth exists in the viewers' minds. In this way he portrays depth, rather than just using the view through the window seen at the back of the room. As in many of his works, the photographic quality of the objects (mostly metallic: armour,  the anvil, the hammers and the red-hot iron itself) that appear in the painting which show realism taken to the extreme. At the back, in the upper right, various objects can be seen on a shelf which form a still life by themselves, which is characteristic of Velázquez' early works.

As a Spanish painter his characters are ordinary people, not idealised as in Italian works. Vulcan could even be said to be quite ugly, and Apollo's face, despite being surrounded by an aura which differentiates him from the rest, is also not idealized.

Painting materials
Part of pigments used by Velázquez in this painting have changed their colours so the canvas lost its original color balance. The wreath of Apollo was originally painted green by mixing (blue) azurite, yellow lake and yellow ochre. The lake pigment is not very stable and so the present color of the wreath is almost blue. The color of the loin cloths changed to flat dark brown while the flesh colour mainly containing yellow ochre, vermilion and azurite remained unchanged.

References

Bibliography
La pintura en el barroco. José Luis Morales y Marín. Espasa Calpe S.A. 1998
Museo del Prado. Pintura española de los siglos XVI y XVII. Enrique Lafuente Ferrari. Aguilar S.A. 1964
Cirlot, L. (dir.), Museo del Prado II, Col. «Museos del Mundo», Tomo 7, Espasa, 2007. , pp. 24–25

Velázquez and The Surrender of Breda: The Making of a Masterpiece. Anthony Bailey. Henry Holt and Company. 2011

External links

Velázquez , exhibition catalog from The Metropolitan Museum of Art (fully available online as PDF), which contains material on Apollo in the Forge of Vulcan (see index)
 Diego Velázquez, Apollo in the Forge of Vulcan, Colourlex

Paintings by Diego Velázquez in the Museo del Prado
1630 paintings
Mythological paintings by Diego Velázquez
Paintings of Apollo
Paintings based on Metamorphoses
Paintings of Vulcan (mythology)